{{DISPLAYTITLE:C13H10O5}}
The molecular formula C13H10O5 (molar mass: 246.21 g/mol, exact mass: 246.0528 u) may refer to:

 Citromycin
 Hispidin
 Isopimpinellin

Molecular formulas